Brewster Building can refer to:

Brewster Building (Galt, California), National Register of Historic Places structure
Brewster Building (Long Island City), JetBlue headquarters in historic car and airplane manufacturing plant
Brewster Apartments, a historic building in Chicago.